Night of Consecration is debut studio album of Pyriphlegethon, released independently on March 1, 2015.

Track listing

Personnel
Adapted from the Night of Consecration liner notes.
 Maurice de Jong (as Mories) – vocals, guitar, synthesizer, drum programming, recording, cover art

Release history

References

External links 
 
 Night of Consecration at Bandcamp

2015 albums